The Tomb of Abu al-Hassan Kharaqani was built by the Ilkhanate and is located near Shahrud, Iran.

Sources 

Mausoleums in Iran
National works of Iran